Cuautla (meaning "where the eagles roam"), officially La heroica e histórica Cuautla, Morelos (The Heroic and Historic Cuautla, Morelos) or H. H. Cuautla, Morelos, is a city and municipality in the Mexican state of Morelos, about 104 kilometers south of Mexico City. In the 2010 census the city population was 154,358. Cuautla is the third most populous city in the state, after Cuernavaca and Jiutepec. The city was founded on April 4, 1829. The 2020 population figures were 187,118 inhabitants for the municipality and 157,336 inhabitants for the city of Cuatula.

The Cuautla Metropolitan Area, the second largest in Morelos, comprises the municipalities of Cuautla, Yautepec, Ayala, Yecapixtla, Atlatlahucan, and Tlayacapan. The metropolitan population (2010) is 434,187.

History

Prehispanic history
The Olmec group who lived in Chalcatzingo (southeast of Cuautla) founded settlements in Cuautla, Tepalcingo, Jonacatepec (Las Pilas), Olintepec, Atlihuayan, Huaxtepec, Gualupita de Cuernavaca, Tlayacapan, etc. (Piña Chan y Plancarte).

Five years after the conquest of Cuahunahuác (Cuernavaca) in (1379 CE), Moctezuma Ilhuicamina conquered Huaxtepec (Oaxtepec), Yautepec, Tlayacapan and other towns of Morelos and Guerrero. With Huaxtepec, which was the prehispanic and colonial capital of the peoples of the Plan de Amilpas, its 25-human settlements including Cuauhtlán, had to pay a tribute of 400 cotton blankets, 400 two-color valances, 400 bedspreads, 800 thin cotton blankets, 400 pairs of shorts (patees), 200 women's shirts, and 1,200 veils (mantillas) every 80 days. In addition, they were required to contribute labor.

Spanish conquest and colonial period
The Plan de Amilpas including Cuautla was conquered by Captain Gonzalo de Sandoval on March 14, 1521. In 1543 New Spain was organized into four provinces: Michoacán, México, Coatzacoalcos, and Las Mixtecas; the present territory of Morelos was part of the Mexico province.

The church and monastery of San Diego were built between 1560 and 1580. The church is relatively small and austere, although there is a beautiful cupola on the south side. The façade of the church is made of pink granite with well-defined bases, columns, and cornices. The small, two-level belltower is square and simple. The monetary is high and formal; it may have been built after the church. The church is unique in that it faces the east, there is no real atrium, and there are neither capillas posas nor an open chapel. Construction of the church of Santo Domingo also began in the middle of the 16th century, but there is little information on it.

After the conquest, Indigenous lands were confiscated, mostly for sugar cane plantations and mills (trapiches). Despite Indigenous protests, Viceroy Gaspar de Zúñiga ruled in favor of the colonists on July 5, 1603. In 1646 the province of México became the Real Audiencia; Cuautla became an alcaldia (mayoralty) belonging to the Intendencia of Puebla.

Independence & 19th century
After a number of successful battles, General José María Morelos arrived in Cuautla in December 1811. On February 19, 1812, Spanish General Félix María Calleja began the 72-day Siege of Cuautla. Morelos was accompanied by Leonardo Bravo, Mariano Matamoros, Hermenegildo Galeana, Nicolás Bravo, and Manuel de Ordiera. 12-year-old Narciso Mendoza, known as the Niño Artillero (Child Gunner) is remembered for stopping an advance of royalist troops by setting off a cannon. Morelos and his army were able to break out on May 2, 1812.

Cuautla was designated a Heroic City (Heroica Ciudad de Morelos) on April 4, 1829, while Felipe B. Montero was Presidente Municipal (mayor).

An 1865 photograph shows the construction of the second floor of the Palacio Municipal (city hall) in 1865. The building was burned during the Revolution.

The railroad station was opened on June 18, 1881, next to the Convento de San Diego. Tourist trains continue to operate along the line.

Revolution & 20th century
As a young man, Emiliano Zapata was concerned about land seizures in Anenecuilco, his hometown. In May 1911 he answered Francisco I. Madero's call to arms against President Porfirio Díaz. After minor battles in Chietla, Izúcar, Metepec Atlixco, Yautepec, and Jonacatepec, he arrived at Cuautla on May 11, 1911. With 4,000 or 5,000 troops he surrounded the city, and the week-long Battle of Cuautla (1911) began. The battle was a major turning point in the Mexican Revolution, as Porfirio Díaz said the battle convinced him to sign the Treaty of Ciudad Juárez and resign.

Nearly seven years later, in April 1919, Colonel Jesus Guajardo assassinated Zapata, apparently under orders of President Venustiano Carranza in Hacienda Chinameca, Ayala. His body was placed on a mule and left on the street before he was brought to Cuautla for burial.

The city hall was burned during the Battle of Cuautla in 1911; the bell Nuestra Señora de Dolores was transferred from the Church of Guadalupita on February 19, 2017 when the city hall was restored.

21st century
Six people, including an 11-year-old child, were killed in the September 17, 2017 Puebla earthquake.

Jesus Corona Damian of Juntos Haremos Historia (Together we will make history coalition) was elected Presidente Municipal (mayor) in the election of July 1, 2018.

Tetelcingo was scheduled to become an autonomous municipality on January 1, 2019, but Cuautla authorities objected.

As of May 4, 2020, there were 505 infections and 59 deaths in the state of Morelos and 62 confirmed infections from the COVID-19 pandemic in Cuautla. Schools and many businesses were closed from mid March until June 1. On June 2, Cuautla reported 224 confirmed cases and 34 deaths from the virus; the reopening of the state was pushed back until at least June 13. Cuautla reported an increase of 137 new cases from January 12 to 14, 2021, making 1,602 cases in all, second highest in the state. On March 8 Cuautla became the third municipality in Morelos to vaccinate senior citizens (60+).

Irving Eduardo Solano Vera ("El Profe"), said to be the leader of the Jalisco New Generation Cartel (CJNG), was arrested in Colonia Santa Rosa on February 18, 2021.

Notable people
Siege of Cuautla
Leonardo Bravo (1764-1812) was in charge of the 2nd sector (Santiago) of the city. Bravo broke out of the city on March 10, 1812, but was later captured and executed. His brothers Miguel and Victor, and his son, Nicolas also fought.
Nicolás Bravo (1776–1854), president of Mexico three times between 1839 and 1846.
Félix María Calleja del Rey y de la Gándara (1753-1828): Royalist general during the siege.
Hermenegildo Galeana (1762-1814): Galeana was in charge of the 1st sector (San Diego) of the city during the siege.
Mariano Matamoros y Guridi (1770-1814) was in charge of the 3rd sector (Buenavista).
Narciso Mendoza (1800-1888): Born in Cuautla, Mendoza belonged to the children's company Compañía de Emulantes (Company of Emulators) organized by Juan Nepomuceno Almonte. Mendoza stopped a royalist offensive by firing a cannon and is known as El Niño Artillero (The Gunner Boy).
José María Teclo Morelos Pérez y Pavón (1765-1815): Hero of the Siege of Cuautla (February 19 – May 2, 1812); the state is named for him.
Other
José Agustín (b. 1944) is a Mexican writer who lives in Cuautla.
Ismael Hernández (b. 1990 in Cuautla) is a Mexican modern pentathlete. He won a bronze medal at the 2016 Summer Olympics.
Felipe B. Montero, president when Cuautla was granted the title ″Heroic City″ in 1829 and chronicler of the siege
Jair Pereira Rodríguez (b. 1986 in Cuautla) is a Mexican football defender who plays for Liga MX C.D. Guadalajara.

Municipal presidents

Teofanes Jiménez, 1911–1912; Cuautla celebrated the 100th anniversary of the siege.
Cruz Vázquez, 1913-1913
Teofanes Jiménez, 1913
Sixto Ceballos, 1913
Angel Díaz, 1913
Sixto Ceballos, 1913-1914
Everardo Espinosa, 1914-1915
Julián Sosa, 1915
Everardo Espinosa, 1915
Pascual Carrillo, 1915
Jesús Hernández, 1915
Nicolás Morales, 1915
Carlos Escobar, 1915-1916	 
Agustín Palacios, 1916	 
Agustín Amado Espindola, 1916
Francisco J. Reygados, 1916
Francisco Tenorio, 1916
Salvador Romero, 1917
Nestor Mendoza, 1917
Julián Sosa, 1917-1918
Lanciano Tamayo, 1918	
Felipe León, 1918
Longino Tamayo, 1918
Jesús Franco, 1918
Felipe J. León, 1918–1919; Zapata's corpse publicly displayed
Pedro Nervaez, 1919-1922
Joaquín Alanis, 1922
Antonio Pliego, 1923-1924
Felipe Amaro, 1924
Pedro Nervaez, 1924-1925
Pedro Albear, 1925
Nemecio Torres, 1925
Antonio Pliego, 1925-1926
Manuel Abundez, 1926-1927
Manuel Contreras, 1927
Felipe Contreras, 1927-1928
Antonio Pliego Quintero, 1928
J. Refugio Bustamante, 1929
Abelardo Flores, 1930
Antonio Pliego Quintero, 1931-1932
Francisco Hernández, 1932
Manuel Abundez, 1933-1934
Gil R. Montero, 1934
J. Isabel Bustamante, 1935-1936
Nicolás Zapata, 1937
Antonio Pliego Quintero, 1938
Alejandro Perdomo, 1939-1940
Eulalio B. Morales, 1940
Alejandro Perdomo, 1940
Benjamin C. López, 1941-1942
Mauro Belaunzarán Tapia, 1942-1944
Torcuato B. Gutiérrez C., 1945
Higinio Peña, 1945-1946
Fausto González Hernández, 1947–1948; Casa de Morelos museum opens
Othón Menchaca, 1949-1950
Antonio Pliego Noyola, 1950 
Manuel Llera Plascencia, 1951–1952; Narciso Mendoza Theater opens
Amado Torres Guerrero, 1953-1954
Leobardo Alanís, 1954
J. Guadalupe Reynoso, 1955–1957; foundation of "Regional Fine Arts Institute"
Antonio Nava Zavala, 1958-1960
Fernando Estrada Sánchez, 1961-1963
Rodolfo Abúndez Fandiño, 1964-1967
Antonio Pliego Noyola, 1968–1971; "Fine Arts Institute" moved to ex-convent Santo Domingo
Angel Torres Escalante, 1971–1973;  narrow-gauge Nacionales de Mexico ends service on October 11, 1973
Ignacio Guerra Tejeda, 1973-1976
Raymundo Llera Peña, 1976–1979; historical bell Nuestra Señora de Dolores transferred to city hall
Rodolfo Abundez Fandiño, 1979
Alfonso Cerqueda Martínez, 1981-1985
Luis Miguel Andreu Acosta, 1985
Martín Garduño Amaga, 1985-1987
Martín Crisóforo Martínez Nájera, 1987-1988
José Guadalupe Vique Marín, 1988
Adolfo Avila Piñarrieta, 1988-1991
Javier Malpica Marines, 1991–1993; creation of Ecological Protection Zone Los Sabinos, Santa Rosa y San Cristóbal
Tadeo Espinosa Díaz, 1993-1997 (PRI); environmental education begins in schools
Francisco Rodríguez Montero, 1997-2000 (PRD)
Neftalí Tajonar Zalazar, 2000-2003 (PRI)
Arturo Damian Cruz Mendoza, 2003-2006 (PRD)
Sergio Rodrigo Valdespin Pérez, 2006-2009 (PAN)
Luis Felipe Xavier Guemes Ríos, 2009-2012 (PRI); Cuautla receives recognition as ″Historical capital of Morelos″
Jesús González Otero, 2013-2015 (PRD-PT-MC)
Raul Tadeo Nava, 2016-2018 (PAN)
Jesús Corona Damián, 2019–present (Together we will make history)

Culture

Celebrations and holidays
January 1: New Year's Day (official holiday)
 January 6: Día de Reyes
 February 5: Día de la Constitución (Monday before the 5th; official holiday)
 February 19: Anniversary of the start of 1812 Siege of Cuautla 
 March 8: Día Internacional de la Mujer
March 21: Anniversary of the birth of Benito Juarez (Monday before the 21st; official holiday)
 Fair of the second Friday of Lent, considered the second in importance of the state (variable date).
 Holy Week (Semana Santa, variable dates)
 April 10: commemoration of the death of Emiliano Zapata (state holiday)
April 30: Children's Day
May 1: Labor Day (official holiday)
 May 2: Anniversary of the end of 1812 Siege of Cuautla
 May 5: Cinco de Mayo (national holiday)
May 10: Mother's Day 
July 25: Feast of Santiago
 August 8: Anniversary of the birth of the General Emiliano Zapata Salazar and feast of St. Dominic de Guzmán
 September 16: Mexican Independence Day Cry of Dolores (official holiday)
 September 30: Anniversary of the birth of the General José María Morelos y Pavón. There is a parade.
 November 2: Day of the Dead
 November 20: Anniversary of the Cry of Revolution (Monday before the 20th; official holiday)
December 25: Christmas Day (official holiday)

Leather, crafts, & textiles
 Cuautla is distinguished by its huarachería (leather sandals).
 Tetelcingo is known for the elaboration of wire birdcages, bread boxes, and lace napkins. Women in Tetelcingo wear traditional Indigenous dress, consisting of a navy blue huipil (skirt) and a chincuete that is girded at the waist with a belt loom weaved by them. There are several workshops that are dedicated to saddlery, the manufacture of huaraches, belts, saddles, and all the necessary equipment for riding.

Food
Rich stews with green or red guacamole, the green mole of pipián with tamales, and cecina. Also huitlacoche, molotes, a squash flower soup (sopa de flor de calabaza), or a mushroom cream soup, or sopa Azteca. Also available is Pollo Morelense, chicken with peanut sauce, flower pancakes, and broken beans (frijoles quebrados).

Art
Motivos sobre el agua, (Motifs on water) is a fresco painted by Olga Costa and José Chávez Morado, hidden inside the Agua Hedionda Spa. There is a group of plump mermaids playing musical instruments at the bottom of the sea. One carries the zither, another the cello, and one a type of shell or tambourine. They are surrounded by fish, shells, corals, and starfish. It was made in 1952.

Dance
Las Tetelcingas is a traditional dance dance from the indigenous town of Tetelcingo.

Typical dress: the authentic suit is that of Tetelcinga, which consists of a huipil (tunic) and a tangle of thick dark blue cloth, tied at the waist with wide folds by means of a blue and red sash, a blue skirt, sandals, with a headband made of flowers. The women's hair is worn long, either loose or braided. Eliseo Aragón said that half a century ago some women used to color their hair blue, red, or green, in the Olmec style. It is also said that drinking cups were used on the head as an ornament. The men's costume consists of white cotton pants tied with a red sash, a long-sleeved cotton shirt, a straw sombrero (hat), a bandana, and sandals; however, there are photographs in which the natives of Tetelcingo wear a kind of jorongo (sleeveless poncho) and short leather pants.

Economy
Among the most important activities in Cuautla you will find:
Agriculture (corn, beans)
Livestock (beef, pork)
Nursery (production of ornamental plants and fruit trees)
Aquaculture (production of aquatic species such as mojarras, prawns, and catfish)
Agroindustry (sugar cane)
General Commerce (financial, administrative and real estate services, premises such as stationery, grocery, food, beverages, etc.)
Services (hotel, restaurant, professional, technical, and personal)
Tourism (natural areas, lodging, restaurants, bars, nightclubs, water parks, spas, and springs.)
Construction. 
Manufacturing.

Most of the companies are related to the automotive industry. The largest employers are Saint-Gobainl, (glass), Sekurit (windshields), and Temic (industrial parts).

Riverside, California is a Sister city.

Transportation
Highways
Mexican Federal Highway 160 west to Cocoyoc-Yautepec-Jiutepec-Cuernavaca; east to Jantetelco-Izucar de Matamoros
Mexican Federal Highway 160D (toll) is an eastern spur of Mexican Federal Highway 95D (toll) from La Pera to Cuautla.
Mexican Federal Highway 115D (toll) north to Oaxtepec-Nepantla-Amecameca; south to Ciudad Ayala-Zacatepec-Atlatlahucan
Mexican Federal Highway 115 north to Tetelcingo-Tepetlixpa-Atlatlahucan-Mexico City-Ixtapaluca; east to Izucar de Matamoros (co-signed with #160)

Public transportation
Local buses or combis serve Cuautla and nearby municipalities. Taxis and ride sharing are available.

Cuautla has several bus terminals for long-distance travel:
Estrella Roja (TER) (Cuernavaca, Mexico City, Airport, Puebla)
Pullman de Morelos (Mexico City, Airport, destinations in most parts state of Morelos)
Omnibus Cristóbal Colón (OCC) Company based in Cuautla, with service to Taxqueña and Central Norte bus terminals in Mexico City, Oaxaca City, and Veracruz (city).
Oro (mostly points east: state of Puebla, plus Cuernavaca and eastern Morelos, parts of Oaxaca, Tlaxcala City, and Guerrero)

Trains
There is no regularly scheduled train service. A tourist train, a remnant of the Interoceanic Railway of Mexico, runs occasionally.

Air
Cuautla does not have an airport; flights are available at Cuernavaca Airport, Mexico City International Airport, and Puebla International Airport.

Communities
 Cuautla is the municipal seat. Its Sister Cities are Renton, Washington, and Riverside, California.
The population is 23,209. 
Tierra Larga has 2,589 inhabitants.
Ampliación Narciso Mendoza has 1,180.
19 de Febrero de 1812 has 1,149 inhabitants, 3 de Mayo has 1,078, and Calderón has 1,050.
Other communities have fewer than 1,000 inhabitants.

Education
As of 2014–2015, there are 24 daycare centers with 508 children, 110 preschools with 533 teachers and 7,545 pupils, 101 elementary schools (grades 1–6) with 1,225 teachers and 22,754 pupils, and 42 middle schools (grades 7–9) with 641 teachers and 11,354 pupils

Geography

Location
Cuautla borders the municipalities of Atlatlahucan, Ayala, Yautepec, and Yecapixtla.

Distance from other parts of Mexico
Cuernavaca -  via La Pera (45 minuties driving time),  via Cuauhnahuac (48 minutes driving time)
 Mexico City - 
Puebla –  (1 hour, 35 minutes driving time)

Size

Attractions

The area is a tourist-friendly region with abundant hot springs and health spas/resorts. It features many archeological sites such as Chalcatzingo and Indigenous communities such as the Tepoztlán and Tetelcingo among others.

Springs, spas, & water parks
Agua Hedionda, classified as one of the important water springs of the world due to its chemical composition, is located in Cuautla. These waters have a characteristic smell reminiscent of rotten eggs because of their sulfur content. The mural Motivos sobre el agua is located in the spa. which was used by Olmecas, Teotihuacanos, Chalcas, Tlahuicas, and Aztecas.Agua Hedionda website
Balneario Los Limones has a spring, swimming pools, wading pool, playground, water slide, picnic area with grills, camping area, fronton court, and a basketball court.
Ejidal spa Cups is located in Las Tazas, Cuautlixco. 
El Almeal is a water park in Cuautla. It has a spring, swimming pools, wading pool, athletic fields, and camping area.
Spa The Plot is a water park in Cuautla at Cuautla-Izucar highway, KM2.
Quinta Manantial is a water park with a spring in Cuautla.  
Balneario Agua Linda is a public swimming pool.
Erandi Spa is a health spa in Cuautla.

Museums
The Morelos House / Museum contains artifacts and descriptions about Mexican War of Independence from Spain (1812-1821).  It honors José María Morelos, whose rebel troops managed to hold off Royalist troops for 72 days, as well as honoring Emiliano Zapata.
The Morelos Museum adjoins the old narrow-gauge railroad which was used to haul sugar cane to the local mills. The Tren Escénico is a  narrow gauge tourist railroad offering train rides pulled by an historic steam locomotive once used by the former Interoceanic Railway of Mexico. The narrow-gauge was retired in 1973. 
The tomb of the famous Mexican revolutionary hero Emiliano Zapata is also located in this city, and every year several festivities are held around the anniversary of his death.
The Teatro Narciso Mendoza is named for the legendary Niño Artillero. This building was inaugurated on January 6, 1952. Today it is a cultural center.

Architecture

The vast majority of buildings in Cuautla are made of brick or cinder blocks, framed by reinforced concrete posts which in turn support reinforced concrete beams, reinforced concrete floors and roofs. Also, many homes in this city, are made with only cinder blocks, cement, and a tin roof. Many of these homes also lack electricity and running water. Nearly all homes have a "tinaco", which is a large plastic water tank on the roof as well as a concrete cisterna below ground. Both are refilled regularly at the same time by the city. When necessary the water is pumped from the cisterna to the Tinaco.  These  water tanks let water out into pipes which have valves that are opened as needed to wash clothes and dishes or to bathe or flush the toilet. A single valve is located at the tinacoto be closed if necessary.

Climate

The city is quite warm year-round.
On the other hand, because Cuautla is somewhat close to the Equator, temperatures year-round tend to reach into the mid-80s to lower 90s°F (upper 20s°C to the lower 30s°C) even during the winter, and in spring on many days the daytime temperatures may reach well into the upper 90s°F (lower 30s°C).

Religion

The dominant religion in Cuautla is Roman Catholicism. There are 22 registered churches in the municipal area.

See also
 Morelos State site on Cuautla (Spanish)
 Governors of Morelos
 Siege of Cuautla
 Battle of Cuautla (1911)
 List of people from Morelos, Mexico

References

External links

Ayuntamiento Constitucional de Cuautla (Constitutional Council of Cuautla) Official website
 Encyclopedia of Municipalities: Cuautla (Spanish)
2005 Census population data statistics INEGI: Instituto Nacional de Estadística, Geografía e Informática (National Institute of Statistics, Geography, and Information)
Morelos Enciclopedia de los Municipios de México (Encyclopedia of Mexican Municipalities)

 

Municipalities of Morelos
People from Morelos
Populated places in Morelos